Konstantinovka is a rural locality in Zhigalovsky District of Irkutsk Oblast, Russia. Population: 

Russian archaeologist, historian, and ethnographer Alexey Okladnikov (1908–1981) was born in Konstantinovka.

Geography
It lies on the left bank of the Typta river, a tributary of the Ilga.

See also
Lena-Angara Plateau

References

External links
Zhigalovsky District - General Information (in Russian)

Rural localities in Irkutsk Oblast
Zhigalovsky District